Peeksville is an unincorporated community in Henry County, in the U.S. state of Georgia.

History
Was a town with a post office called Peeksville was established in 1870, and remained in operation until 1901. The community was named after W. H. Peek, a local politician.

References

Unincorporated communities in Henry County, Georgia
Unincorporated communities in Georgia (U.S. state)